Knockavilla–Donaskeigh Kickhams GAA is a Gaelic Athletic Association club located in Dundrum, County Tipperary in Ireland. The club participates in both Gaelic football and hurling competitions organised by Tipperary GAA.

History
The club was formed in 1935 when Knockavilla, Donaskeigh and Dundrum amalgamated to form the Kickham club. This meeting is believed to have been taken place at the newly built Chaplain's house at the Convent Cross. The first officers were President - Rev Fr. Michael Quinlan, Chairman – Sean O’Dwyer, Vice-chairman – Paddy Cleary, Secretary – Con McCarthy, Treasurer – Michael Ryan (D).

In that first year the club won the West Senior Hurling Championship and again three years later in 1938. The club won twelve further west senior hurling titles between 1946 and 1960. One player who was a member of all twelve of these winning teams was John Farrell. Between 1943 and 1947 the club also won five minor titles, Heelan played on all of these 5 minor teams

After the success of the previous two decades the 1960s saw a decline in the club's fortunes until 1966 when a west under 21 hurling title was won and retained again in 1967 and the club's first county title was claimed.

The 1970s and 1980s saw the emergence of the club as a dominant force in juvenile competition winning many underage titles in both hurling and football.

The late 1970s and 1990s saw this under age work bear fruit when the adult teams won West titles in Minor Hurling 1979,1984,1990–91, 1993, 1994, and 1999. County Intermediate Hurling 1992, U-21 West Hurling 1993, U-21 County Hurling 1994, West Junior Hurling 1987 and 1998. Before reclaiming The West Senior crown in 1997 and 1999.

Football titles were also won in 1979 Minor West 1981 Junior (county) U-21 1991(County). Minor 1992 (County) and 1999, Junior 1992. Intermediate 1985 and 1993 and 1996 (County). Senior Championship and league 1998.

In the 2000s (decade), the Minor and junior hurlers, Intermediate footballers have brought more titles back to the club.

Kickham Park
Kickham Park, Dundrum was officially reopened on Sunday 11 May 2008.

The latest development of the facilities commenced in 1999 with the purchase of the wooded area adjacent to the field, This area was then cleared to facilitate a second pitch, We built two new dressing rooms and extended the facilities of the clubhouse. The final part of the development was the completion of the spectator stand and hurling wall.

All the facilities looked magnificent on 11 May 2008, when Tipperary played Limerick in a senior Hurling challenge match to mark the occasion.

The current field was purchased from Lysaght's sometime during 1957/58(approx) and developed over the following few years. The biggest job being in 1959, when the pitch was turned to its current position. Previously, the pitch ran in the other direction.
Previous generations of club members have put a lot of hours into developing and draining the pitch over a number of decades.

Honours

Hurling
 West Tipperary Senior Hurling Championship (17)
 1935, 1938, 1946, 1947, 1949, 1950, 1952, 1953, 1954, 1955, 1956, 1958, 1959, 1960, 1997, 1999, 2006.
 West Tipperary Senior hurling League: (13)
 1944 (Knockavilla only), 1947, 1949, 1951, 1954, 1957, 1977, 1982, 1993, 1995, 1998, 1999, 2006
 Tipperary Intermediate Hurling Championship (1)
 1992
 West Tipperary Intermediate Hurling Championship (1)
 1992,2020
 West Tipperary Junior Hurling Championship (9)
 1931 (as Knockavilla), 1932 (as Donaskeigh), 1941 (as Donaskeigh), 1981, 1987, 1998, 2005, 2013, 2015
 West Tipperary Junior B Hurling Championship (2)
 2007, 2010
 Tipperary Under-21 Hurling Championship: (2)
 1967, 1994
 West Tipperary Under-21 Hurling Championship: (6) 
 1966, 1967, 1986, 1993, 1994, 2008
 West Tipperary Minor A Hurling Championship: (18)
 1941(with Golden as Invincibles), 1943, 1944, 1945, 1946, 1947, 1951, 1955, 1979, 1984, 1990, 1991, 1993, 1994, 1999, 2001, 2002, 2007, 2016
 West Tipperary Minor B Hurling Championship: (2)
 2001, 2015 2018 2021
County tipperary minor hurling championship (1)
 **2021

 West Junior Hurling No. 2. Championship: (8)
 1947, 1948, 1950, 1951, 1952, 1968, 1971, 2007, 2010.

Football
 West Tipperary Senior Football Championship: (1)
 1998
 West Tipperary Senior Football League: (1)
 1998
 Tipperary Intermediate Football Championship (2)
 1996, 2002
 West Tipperary Intermediate Football Championship: (4)
 1985, 1993, 1996, 2002
 Tipperary Junior Football Championship (3)
 1981, 1992, 2009
 West Tipperary Junior Football Championship (4)
 1981, 1992, 2007, 2021
 Tipperary Under-21 B Football Championship (1)
 1991
 West Tipperary Under-21 B Football Championship (2)
 1991, 2013
 West Tipperary Minor A Football Championship (2)
 1979, 1999
 Tipperary Minor B Football Championship (1)
 1992
 West Tipperary Minor B Football Championship (2)
 1992, 2005, 2006

Notable players
 Ger Browne
 David Butler (Kerry)
 John Farrell
 Brian Horgan
 Fergal Horgan (referee)
 Martin McGrath
 Donal O'Brien

References

External links
Tipperary GAA site
Official Knockavilla–Donaskeigh Kickhams GAA Club website

Gaelic games clubs in County Tipperary
Gaelic football clubs in County Tipperary
Hurling clubs in County Tipperary